The Liverpool Range is a mountain range and a lava-field province in New South Wales, Australia.

The eastern peaks of the range were the traditional territory of the Wonnarua people.

Geography
The Liverpool Range starts from the volcanic plateau known as the Barrington Tops and runs for about  westwards, forming the northern boundary of the Hunter Region. Parts of the Liverpool Range form the watershed between the coastal and inland drainage of New South Wales and thus form a component of the Great Dividing Range.  The western end of the Liverpool Range merges into the Warrumbungle Range.

The Liverpool Range has a reputation as a breeding ground for severe summer thunderstorms. The peaks of the range generally experience several snowfalls each winter.

History
The Liverpool Range was named after Robert Banks Jenkinson, 2nd Earl of Liverpool, who was the prime minister of the United Kingdom at the time of its exploration by Europeans.

The first route across the range was Pandora's Pass discovered by Allan Cunningham.  This is located near the western end of the range, north from the town of Coolah and within Coolah Tops National Park.  The crossing used by the New England Highway is Nowlands Gap (otherwise known as Murrurundi Gap), which crosses the range near its east end.  The railway from Newcastle to Werris Creek crosses under this pass via Ardglen Tunnel.

The southern slopes of the Liverpool Range are drained by the headwaters of the Hunter River and its tributaries, such as the Pages River, which flows through the town of Murrurundi.  The northern slopes are drained by the headwaters of the Peel River and the Mooki River. The Talbragar River and the Coolaburragundy River also rise on the range and flow south-west, joining near the town of Dunedoo.

See also

 List of mountains in Australia
 List of volcanoes in Australia

References

Volcanoes of New South Wales
Extinct volcanoes
Biogeography of New South Wales
IBRA subregions
Great Dividing Range
Hunter River (New South Wales)